The Two-Soul Woman is a 1918 American silent drama film directed by Elmer Clifton and starring Priscilla Dean, Ashton Dearholt and Joseph W. Girard.

Cast
 Priscilla Dean as Joy Fielding / Edna
 Ashton Dearholt as Chester Castle
 Joseph W. Girard as Dr. Copin 
 Evelyn Selbie as Leah

References

Bibliography
James Robert Parish & Michael R. Pitts. Film directors: a guide to their American films. Scarecrow Press, 1974.

External links
 

1918 films
1918 drama films
1910s English-language films
American silent feature films
Silent American drama films
American black-and-white films
Universal Pictures films
Films directed by Elmer Clifton
1910s American films